Amezcua or Amézcua is a Spanish surname. This Surname is mainly used in Latin America, and Spain.

Notable people
Notable people with this surname include:
 Adán Amezcua Contreras, Mexican drug trafficker
 Alejandro Amezcua, Mexican canoer
 Carlos Amezcua, American journalist
 Christian Francisco Amezcua, Chef
 Efraín Amézcua, Mexican footballer
 Jesús Amezcua Contreras, Mexican drug trafficker
 Laura Karen Amezcua, Speech-Language Pathologist and Ultra Half-Marathoner
 Luis Amezcua Contreras, Mexican drug trafficker
 Alejandro M Amezcua, singer/songwriter
 Drew I. Amezcua, BMX